Chromocheilosia is a genus of South American hoverflies.

Species List
C. bicolor (Shannon & Aubertin, 1933)
C. incerta (Shannon & Aubertin, 1933)
C. pubescens (Shannon & Aubertin, 1933)

References

Diptera of South America
Eristalinae
Hoverfly genera
Taxa named by Frank Montgomery Hull